This is a list of museums in the Province of Milan, Lombardy Region, Italy.

Museums and ecomuseums

References

External links 
 Cultural observatory of Lombardy Region
 Museums in the Province of Milan

Milan, Province
Metropolitan City of Milan
.
Buildings and structures in the Province of Milan